The Prawer Commission was set up to implement the recommendations of the Goldberg Commission on resolving outstanding land issues between the Negev Bedouin and the State of Israel. Chaired by Ehud Prawer, Benjamin Netanyahu's director of planning, it published its recommendations on 2 June 2011.

The commission found that an estimated 50% of unrecognized villages were built within Jewish planning areas. It recommended that the inhabitants of these villages, some 30,000 people – about 40% of the total Israeli Bedouin population unrecognized by Israel, should be relocated to the seven existing government built Bedouin townships.

It proposed that the villagers should be offered compensation of between $1.7 billion and $2.4 billion including $365 million for expanding the townships. The compensation would be reduced to zero over a period of five years and if agreement had not been reached the land would be forfeited and designated as state land.

A proposed government sponsored vote in the Knesset was postponed after some members objected that the terms were too generous.

See also 
 Prawer Plan

References

Israeli commissions and inquiries
2011 in Israel
Bedouins in Israel